"Purple Line" is Tohoshinki's 16th Japanese single, written by the Korean composer who made Tohoshinki's biggest hits in Korea such as "Rising Sun" and ""O"-Jung.Ban.Hap." It became Tohoshinki's first Japanese single to reach #1 on the Oricon Weekly sales chart in Japan, making the group the first foreign male group or boyband to top the Japanese charts and second Korean artist after BoA to do so. "Purple Line" was Tohoshinki's first single that was originally released in Japanese and later released in Korean as a single. According to the members, the name "Purple Line" refers to the thin rays of light on horizon when the sun sets.  Despite being the first #1 single from Tohoshinki, it is not their strongest single in terms of physical sales, with "Break Out!" having the biggest lead in Japan. It was released a week before their third Japanese album  T which included the song in its tracks.

Music video
The music video was shot in South Korea, the first time for a Japanese single by the group. The producers used new strategies to market the song and the video. First, a shortened music video was released in Japan for the Japanese version of the song. On January 24, 2008, a Korean version of "Purple Line" was also released. On February 4, 2008, SM Entertainment surprised fans with the release of the full music video; however, with the Korean version of the song. A Japanese version of the full music video was also released a few days later.

Live performances

Japan
2008.01.18 - NHK Music Japan
2008.01.25 - Music Fighter
2008.01.26 - Melodix!
2008.01.28 - Hey! Hey! Hey! Music Champ
2008.02.02 - Music Fair 21
2008.02.08 - NHK Music Japan
2008.02.11 - 月光音楽団 
2008 - a-nation 2008 (several dates)

South Korea
2008.02.24 - SBS Inkigayo
2008.02.29 - KBS Music Bank
2008.05.17 - 6th Annual Korean Music Festival (in USA)
2008.06.07 - Dream concert
2008.06.15 - Super Triple Concert
2008.07.20 - KBS 60th Anniversary of Korean Constitution
2008.08.15 - Summer SMTown Concert 2008

Track listing

Japan

CD
 "Purple Line"
 "Dead End" (STY Gin n' Tonic mix)
 "Zion" (Zero G Remix)
 "Purple Line" (Less Vocal)
 "Dead End" (STY Gin n' Tonic mix) (Less Vocal)

DVD
 Asia Tour Bangkok Show Off Shot Movie
 Asia Tour Bangkok Show Special Off Shot Movie

South Korea

CD
 "Purple Line"
 "Dead End" (STY Gin n' Tonic mix)
 "Zion" (Zero G Remix)
 "Purple Line" (Less Vocal)
 "Dead End" (STY Gin n' Tonic mix) (Less Vocal)
 Purple Line (Korean version)

DVD
 Asia Tour Bangkok Show Off Shot Movie
 Asia Tour Bangkok Show Special Off Shot Movie

Release history

Charts

Oricon sales chart (Japan)

Korea Top 20 foreign albums & singles

References

External links
 http://toho-jp.net/

2008 singles
TVXQ songs
Oricon Weekly number-one singles
2008 songs
Rhythm Zone singles